The following lists events in the year 1991 in China.

Incumbents
General Secretary of the Communist Party: Jiang Zemin
President: Yang Shangkun
Premier: Li Peng
Vice President: Wang Zhen 
Vice Premier: Yao Yilin

Governors  
 Governor of Anhui Province – Fu Xishou 
 Governor of Fujian Province – Jia Qinglin 
 Governor of Gansu Province – Jia Zhijie
 Governor of Guangdong Province – Ye Xuanping then Zhu Senlin 
 Governor of Guizhou Province – Wang Zhaowen
 Governor of Hainan Province – Liu Jianfeng
 Governor of Hebei Province – Cheng Weigao
 Governor of Heilongjiang Province – Shao Qihui 
 Governor of Henan Province – Li Changchun 
 Governor of Hubei Province – Guo Shuyan 
 Governor of Hunan Province – Chen Bangzhu
 Governor of Jiangsu Province – Chen Huanyou  
 Governor of Jiangxi Province – Wu Guanzheng  
 Governor of Jilin Province – Wang Zhongyu then Gao Yan 
 Governor of Liaoning Province – Yue Qifeng 
 Governor of Qinghai Province – Jin Jipeng then Tian Chengping 
 Governor of Shaanxi Province – Bai Qingcai 
 Governor of Shandong Province – Zhao Zhihao 
 Governor of Shanxi Province – Wang Senhao then Hu Fuguo  
 Governor of Sichuan Province – Zhang Haoruo  
 Governor of Yunnan Province – Li Jiating 
 Governor of Zhejiang Province – Ge Hongsheng (until March), Wan Xueyuan (starting March)

Events
1991 Sino-Soviet Border Agreement
Eastern China flood of 1991
September 24 – According to Shanxi Province government official confirmed reported, a human stampede occur ongoing to Lantern festival, Yingze Park, Yingze District, Taiyuan, Shanxi, as resulting to 105 persons were crushing to death, 108 persons were hurt.

Culture
List of Chinese films of 1991

Births
July 20 – Merxat, actor

Sport
Chinese Jia-A League 1991
November 16–30 – 1991 FIFA Women's World Cup

References

 
China
Years of the 20th century in China
1990s in China
China